M. Kantharaj Urs Road is a road in Mysore city, Karnataka state, India.

Location 
The Road starts at K. G. Koppal and terminates near Kukkarahalli Lake Tank bund Road over M. B. Padma Circle covering the localities of K. G. Koppal, Saraswathipuram. Enroute this hosts the NCC Mysore headquarters, and house of Dr. Sarvepalli Radhakrishnan, who resided while working as a Professor in University of Mysore. TTL College, Muslim Hostel complex, Fire Brigade, Govt Text Book Press, University Engineering Division can be located en route.

See also 
 New Kantharaj Urs Road
 Devaraj Urs Road, Mysore

References 

Suburbs of Mysore
Roads in Mysore
Mysore South